Ormputten is a pseudo-lake in Stockholm County, Södermanland, Sweden. It is slowly retracting, and may soon become a bog.
The water surface is very small, fairly round in shape, surrounded by quagmire and strongly acidic with a pH of about 3.9.   The lake is situated in the Paradiset nature reserve, and requires a short hike through pathless terrain to access.

References

Lakes of Stockholm County